The 2004 EHF European Women's Handball Championship was held in Hungary from 9–19 December, it was won by Norway after beating Denmark 27–25 in the final match.

Venues
The 2004 European Championship was held in the following cities:
Debrecen (Preliminary Group A, Main Group 2)
Zalaegerszeg (Preliminary Group B)
Békéscsaba (Preliminary Group C)
Győr (Preliminary Group D, Main Group 1)
Budapest (Final Round)

Qualification

1 Bold indicates champion for that year. Italic indicates host for that year.
2 as FR Yugoslavia

Competition format
Preliminary Round: 16 teams are divided into four groups. They play each other in a single round robin system, so each team plays three matches. A win is worth two points, while a draw is worth one point. The top three teams from each group advance to the Main Round.
Main Round: 12 teams are divided in two groups. They play against the teams they didn't play in the Preliminary Round, so each team plays 3 matches. All points from the Preliminary Round, except the points gained against the 4th place team in the preliminary group, are carried forward into the Main Round. Same round robin rules apply as in the Preliminary Round. Top 2 teams from each group advance to the semifinals, while the third placed team from each group advances to the 5th-6th Place Play-off, and the fourth placed team to the 7th-8th Place Play-off. 
Final Round: 8 teams play in the final weekend of the championships. 3rd place teams from the Main Round play in the 5th-6th Place Play-off, and 4th place team to the 7th-8th Place Play-off. Other teams play in the semifinals. Losers of the semifinals advance to the 3rd-4th Place Play-off, and winners advance to the final.

Squads

Preliminary round

Group A

Group B

Group C

Group D

Main round

Group I

Group II

Final round

Bracket

Semifinals

Seventh place game

Fifth place game

Third place game

Final

Ranking and Statistics

Final ranking

All-Star Team
Goalkeeper: 
Left wing: 
Left back: 
Pivot: 
Centre back: 
Right back: 
Right wing: 
Most valuable player: 
Chosen by team officials and EHF experts: EHF

Top goalscorers

Source: EHF

Top goalkeepers

Source: EHF

Sport in Zalaegerszeg
European Women's Handball Championship
H
H
European Handball Championship W
European Handball Championship W
Women's handball in Hungary
European Women's Handball Championship
December 2004 sports events in Europe
2000s in Budapest
Sport in Győr
Békéscsaba